Philip Bouffleur was a member of the Wisconsin State Assembly.

Biography
A native of Prussia, Bouffleur was born on September 7, 1829. From 1849 to 1851, he served with the Prussian Army. Pursuits he followed afterwards include shoemaking.

On November 27, 1855, Bouffleur married Mary Reinlinder. They would have eight children. Bouffleur was affiliated with the Methodist Episcopal Church. He died on November 24, 1912.

Political career
Bouffleur was a member of the Assembly during the 1885 session. Previously, he had been Postmaster of Springville, Vernon County, Wisconsin from 1864 to 1883. He was a Republican.

References

External links

Republican Party members of the Wisconsin State Assembly
19th-century Methodists
Prussian Army personnel
Shoemakers
1829 births
1912 deaths
Burials in Wisconsin
Prussian emigrants to the United States
Place of birth missing
19th-century American politicians